William Hybels (born December 12, 1951) is an American church figure and author. He is the founding and former senior pastor of Willow Creek Community Church in South Barrington, Illinois, one of the most attended churches in North America, with an average attendance of nearly 24,000 as of late 2018. He is the founder of the Willow Creek Association and creator of the Global Leadership Summit. Hybels is also an author of a number of Christian books, especially on the subject of Christian leadership.

Hybels was slated to retire from his position at Willow Creek in October 2018; however, he resigned in April 2018 after allegations of sexual misconduct were made against him. Although Hybels has denied all allegations, an independent review found the allegations to be credible.

Early life and education

Hybels was born and raised in Kalamazoo, Michigan. He is Dutch-American and was a regular participant in the Christian Reformed Church in North America which holds to Calvinist Theology. Hybels's father was an entrepreneur in wholesale produce whose work ethic was the model for his son. In a 2006 interview with the Chicago Tribune, he pointed to an experience at a Wisconsin summer camp as a teenager that crystallized his understanding and personal embrace of Christian belief. Hybels holds a bachelor's degree in Biblical Studies from Trinity International University, near Chicago.

Willow Creek Community Church
In the early 1970s, Hybels was studying at Trinity International University (then called Trinity College) when Gilbert Bilezikian, a lecturer, challenged the class about an Acts 2-based church. Hybels was captivated with the vision and abandoned his business aspirations for ministry.

In 1971, Hybels—then serving as youth pastor at South Park Church in Park Ridge, Illinois—started a youth group with friend Dave Holmbo called 'Son City'. Modern music, dramatic skits and multimedia were combined with Bible studies in relevant language, and the group grew from 25 to 1,200 in just three years.

After 300 youth waited in line for a service in May 1974, Hybels and other leaders began dreaming of forming a new church. They surveyed the community to find out why people weren't coming to church. Common answers were reported to be: "church is boring", "they're always asking for money", or "I don't like being preached down to." These answers shaped the group's approach to the new church.

On October 12, 1975, the group held its first service at Willow Creek Theater in Palatine, Illinois. One hundred and twenty-five people attended the service. The rent and other costs were paid for with 1,200 baskets of tomatoes, sold door-to-door by 100 teenagers. Hybels spoke on "New Beginnings". Within two years, the church had grown to 2,000.

Challenges in 1979 led to a recommissioning of the church's vision to be broader and deeper than before. Hybels apologized for the example of his relentless schedule and overemphasis on grace. "We've set up all our leadership structures and goals to grow a full functioning Acts 2 community, as opposed to just an evangelizing machine that doesn't drive the roots down deep and do all the other things it's supposed to do."

In 1981, the church moved to its current location in South Barrington. By 2000, six services were being held each weekend for 15,000 attendees in a  building. In 2004, a new Worship Center was opened. With a capacity of more than 7,000, the state-of-the-art auditorium is one of the largest theaters in the United States. In 2017, the church averaged 25,000 attendees per week, making it the eighth largest church in America, according to Outreach 100. In September 2018, Religion News Service reported attendance was down 9% across all campuses, following scandal involving founder Bill Hybels and resignation of the entire senior leadership team.

On July 1, 2010, Hybels introduced President Barack Obama for a speech on immigration reform.

Hybels was not heavily involved in the day-to-day operations of the church between mid-2006 to 2008. Gene Appel served as lead pastor of the South Barrington Campus from mid-2006 until Easter 2008. Appel's role allowed Hybels the ability to serve a more direct role in the Willow Creek Association.

The Global Leadership Summit
Hybels started the Global Leadership Summit (hosted by the Global Leadership Network (GLN) (rebranded from Willow  Creek Association in 2018)) in 1995 as an annual training event for leaders to sharpen their skills. The summit telecasts live from the campus of Willow Creek Community Church, with 118,000 people watching via livestream at host sites across the U.S. in 2018, and hundreds of thousands more later watching via video in countries around the world. The Summit lost more than 100 host sites and tens of thousands of viewers in 2018 following the Hybels' scandal.

Misconduct allegations and resignation

On March 23, 2018, the Chicago Tribune published an article detailing allegations of sexual misconduct by Hybels spanning decades. The article reported that Hybels had engaged in a prolonged affair with a married woman; however, this allegation was retracted by the woman herself. The Tribune wrote that the elders of Willow Creek had conducted an internal review of Hybels' behavior which led to no findings of misconduct; following this report, at least three leaders of the Willow Creek Association board reportedly resigned their posts because they believed the inquiry to have been insufficient. All accusations have been denied by Hybels.

Hybels had planned to retire in October 2018 to focus his energy on the Willow Creek Association. On April 10, 2018, Hybels announced that he was resigning, effective immediately, stating he did not want to be a distraction to the church's ministry. He also announced that he would leave the board of the Willow Creek Association and would no longer lead Willow Creek's Global Leadership Summit.

On April 21, 2018, the Chicago Tribune and Christianity Today reported further misconduct allegations which were not part of the initial investigation. In response, the Willow Creek elders stated their intent to examine reports regarding "allegations that have not been previously investigated by the Elder Board". The elders said they would seek wise counsel and work with experts, developing a collaborative process.

Despite its initial denial and defense of Hybels, the Willow Creek Board of Elders released a statement on May 9, 2018, as part of their second investigation into allegations against him; the statement indicated that the Board "[does] not believe the stories were all lies or that all the [accusers] were colluding against him."

On August 5, 2018, The New York Times published allegations from a former employee of Hybels, who alleges that he repeatedly sexually harassed and assaulted her in the 1980s, including fondling her breasts and obtaining oral sex. The complainant only came forward after hearing of the other allegations against Hybels, but crucially had contemporaneous evidence of her allegations from people that she confided in at the time. Hybels denied the allegations.

On August 7, 2018, Steve Carter, one of the two lead pastors who would have taken over leadership at Willow Creek and who had publicly defended Hybels on two prior occasions, tendered his resignation, citing the untenable position he was in given the church's inadequate attention to the matter once Hybels' history of misconduct became known. The following day, on the eve of the Global Leadership Summit, Heather Larson, the other lead pastor, also resigned, and the members of the elder board all stated they would step down by the end of the year. Steve Gillen, lead pastor of Willow Creek's North Shore campus, assumed interim leadership. The church undertook a process to replace the elder board, and announced on January 19, 2019, that a new elder board had been installed.

In March 2019, The Washington Post reported that a six-month independent review by four evangelical leaders found the misconduct allegations against Hybels to be credible. The reviewers asserted that were Hybels still pastor at Willow Creek, disciplinary action would be required.

In January 2020, the church announced that Hybels' mentor, Gilbert Bilezikian had also engaged in "inappropriate behavior" after a church member alleged he had sexually assaulted her over a number of years.

Publications
Books which Hybels has authored or made a contribution to include: 
 Authenticity: Being Honest with God and Others (and Kevin Harney) (Zondervan, 1996) – 
 Axiom: Powerful Leadership Proverbs (Zondervan, 2008) – 
 Becoming a Contagious Christian (and Mark Mittelberg) (Zondervan, 1996) – 
 Character: Reclaiming Six Endangered Qualities (and Kevin Harney) (Zondervan, 1997) – 
Christians in a Sex-Crazed Culture (Scripture Press Publications, 1989) 
 Commitment: Developing Deeper Devotion to Christ (and Kevin Harney) (Zondervan, 1996) – 
 Community: Building Relationships Within God's Family (and Kevin Harney) (Zondervan, 1996) – 
 Courageous Faith Through the Year (and Keri Wyatt Kent) (InterVarsity Press, 2004) – 
 Courageous Leadership (Zondervan, 2002) – 
 Descending Into Greatness (Zondervan, 1993) – 
 Engraved on Your Heart: Living the Ten Commandments Day by Day (Cook Communications, 2000) – 
 Essential Christianity: Practical Steps for Spiritual Growth (and Kevin Harney) (Zondervan, 2005) – 
 Finding God in the Storms of Life (Inter-varsity Press, 2002) – 
 Fit to be Tied: Making Marriage Last a Lifetime (and Lynne Hybels) (Zondervan, 1991) – 
 Fruit of the Spirit: Living the Supernatural Life (and Kevin Harney) (Zondervan, 1998) – 
 Getting a Grip: Finding Balance in Your Daily Life (and Kevin Harney) (Zondervan, 1998) – 
 Holy Discontent: Fueling the Fire That Ignites Personal Vision (Zondervan, 2007) – 
 Honest to God? Becoming an Authentic Christian (Zondervan, 1990) – 
 How to Hear God (InterVarsity Press, 1999) – 
 James: Live Wisely (Zondervan, 1999) – 
 Jesus: Seeing Him More Clearly (and Kevin Harney) (Zondervan, 2005) – 
 Just Walk Across the Room: Simple Steps Pointing People to Faith (Zondervan, 2006) – 
 Lessons on Love: Building Deeper Relationships (and Kevin Harney) (Zondervan, 2005) – 
 Living in God's Power: Finding God's Strength for Life's Challenges (and Kevin Harney) (Zondervan, 2005) 
 Love in Action: Experiencing the Joy of Serving (and Kevin Harney) (Zondervan, 2005) – 
 Making Life Work: Putting God's Wisdom Into Action (Inter-varsity Press, 1998) – 
 Marriage: Building Real Intimacy (and Kevin Harney) (Zondervan, 2005) – 
 Meeting God: Psalms for the Highs and Lows of Life (and Kevin Harney) (Zondervan, 2005) – 
 New Identity: Discovering Who You Are in Christ (and Kevin Harney) (Zondervan, 2005) – 
 Parenting: How to Raise Spiritually Healthy Kids (and Kevin Harney) (Zondervan, 2005) – 
 1 Peter: Stand Strong (Zondervan, 1999) – 
 Philippians: Run the Race. (Zondervan, 1999) – 
 Prayer: Opening Your Heart to God (and Kevin Harney) (Zondervan, 2005) – 
 Reaching Out: Sharing God's Love Naturally (and Kevin Harney) (Zondervan, 2005) – 
 Rediscovering Church: The Story and Vision of Willow Creek Community Church (and Lynne Hybels) (Zondervan, 1997) – 
 Revelation: Experience God's Power (Zondervan, 2001) – 
 Romans: Find Freedom (Zondervan, 1999) – 
 Sermon on the Mount 1: Connect with God (Zondervan, 2001) – 
 Sermon on the Mount 2: Connect with Others (Zondervan, 2001) – 
 Significance: Understanding God's Purpose for Your Life (and Kevin Harney) (Zondervan, 2005) – 
 Simplify: Ten Practices to Unclutter Your Soul (Tyndale Momentum, 2014) – 
Tender Love: God's Gift of Sexual Intimacy (Moody Publications, 1993) – 
The Pastor's Guide to Personal Spiritual Formation (and Reginald Johnson, Neil B. Wiseman) (Beacon Hill Press, 2004) – 
 The Power of a Whisper: Hearing God, Having the Guts to Respond (Zondervan, 2010) – 
 The Real Deal: Discover the Rewards of Authentic Relationships (and Kevin Harney) (Zondervan, 2005) – 
 The Real You (Zondervan, 1996) – 
 The Volunteer Revolution (Zondervan, 2004) – 
 Too Busy Not to Pray (InterVarsity Press, 1994) – 
 Transformation: Letting God Change You from the Inside Out (and Kevin Harney) (Zondervan, 2005) – 
 Transparency (Zondervan, 1997) – 
 When Leadership and Discipleship Collide (Zondervan, 2007) 
 Who You Are When No One's Looking (InterVarsity Press, 1995) –

Literature 
 Rainer Schacke: Learning from Willow Creek? Cuvillier, Göttingen 2009,

References

External links

 
 
 

American Protestant ministers and clergy
American evangelicals
American Christian writers
Living people
1951 births
Trinity Evangelical Divinity School alumni
American people of Dutch descent
People from Kalamazoo, Michigan
People from South Barrington, Illinois